New Brighton Village Hall was a historic village hall located at New Brighton, Staten Island, New York. It was built between 1868 and 1871 in the Second Empire style. It was a three-story brick building with a mansard roof sheathed with gray slate shingles.

It was added to the National Register of Historic Places in 1978.

Due to neglect, it was torn down in February 2004 and replaced with a residential building.

References

Buildings and structures demolished in 2004
City and town halls on the National Register of Historic Places in New York (state)
Demolished buildings and structures in Staten Island
Former New York City Designated Landmarks
Government buildings completed in 1871
Government buildings in Staten Island
Government buildings on the National Register of Historic Places in New York City
National Register of Historic Places in Staten Island
New York City Designated Landmarks in Staten Island
Second Empire architecture in New York (state)